Amanita calyptratoides, or Peck's candlestick amanita, is a species of Amanita found in southern California

References

External links

calyptratoides
Fungi of California
Fungi described in 1909